Denis Andreevich Tolpeko (born January 29, 1985) is a Russian former professional ice hockey centre. He most recently played for HC Spartak Moscow of the Kontinental Hockey League (KHL).

Playing career
As a youth, Tolpeko played in the 1999 Quebec International Pee-Wee Hockey Tournament with a team from Moscow.

Tolpeko was signed as an undrafted free agent by the Philadelphia Flyers on July 5, 2006. He made his NHL debut with the Flyers on October 4, 2007 against the Calgary Flames. A month later on November 15, Tolpeko scored his first NHL goal against the New York Rangers on goaltender Henrik Lundqvist. Following the season, Tolpeko signed with Dynamo Moscow on May 29, 2008.

In the off-season prior to the 2015–16 campaign, Tolpeko was traded by Salavat Yulaev Ufa to Torpedo Nizhny Novgorod on July 31, 2015. In his first season with Torpedo, Tolpeko lasted just 5 games with the club, before he was again traded to his fifth top-flight Russian club, Amur Khabarovsk on October 1, 2015.

Career statistics

References

External links
 

1985 births
Living people
Amur Khabarovsk players
Expatriate ice hockey players in Canada
Expatriate ice hockey players in the United States
HC Dynamo Moscow players
HC Neftekhimik Nizhnekamsk players
HC Spartak Moscow players
HC Sochi players
HC Vityaz players
Philadelphia Flyers players
Philadelphia Phantoms players
Regina Pats players
Russian expatriate sportspeople in Canada
Russian expatriate sportspeople in the United States
Russian ice hockey right wingers
Salavat Yulaev Ufa players
Seattle Thunderbirds players
Ice hockey people from Moscow
Torpedo Nizhny Novgorod players
Undrafted National Hockey League players